The Illinois Marathon is a for-profit marathon which was held for the first time on April 11, 2009 in Champaign, Illinois. This was to be the first marathon ever held in Champaign. The course is very flat and it was expected to produce fast times, with only  of elevation change. Race weekends have been held annually on the fourth weekend in April since 2009, with the only cancellation to date being the 2020 Race Weekend as a result of the COVID-19 pandemic.  
The races offered are:
 marathon
 half marathon
 four-person marathon relay
 10K run
 5K run
  youth races
 1 Mile Run
The race attracted a total of over 8000 finishers in the first year. There were approximately 14000-15000 participants at the 10th annual event in 2019. The Illinois Marathon is a qualifying marathon for the Boston Marathon.

Mission statement
The Illinois Marathon Mission Statement: Quality is a top priority for the marathon. "The Illinois Marathon is committed to being a responsible member of society, giving back to our community, the state, and charities." The Illinois Marathon also wants spectators and runners to find how important exercise is in leading a healthy lifestyle.

Course information
The Illinois Marathon course exists throughout Champaign and Urbana. A large portion of the race is run on the University of Illinois at Urbana–Champaign campus. The starting line is near the University of Illinois' State Farm Center. The races finish at the 50-yard line of Zuppke Field in Memorial Stadium.

Traditions

Community Involvement

Annual Shoe Drive
At every Illinois Marathon since 2016, Jenette Jurczyk, National Director of The She Said Project, has organized the annual shoe drive for the runners to donate used shoes.  Under the name, The Shoe Said Project, thousands of shoes have been collected and distributed to local agencies, as well as far reaching communities in developing nations, thanks to a partnership with the Share Your Soles Foundation.

27th Mile Celebration Victory Bash

2009 Illinois Marathon 
Over 8,000 runners participated in the first annual Illinois Marathon. The 2009 Illinois Marathon Champaign was a central location in the Midwest, attracting runners from cities such as Minneapolis, Chicago and St. Louis. Based on a report done by the Champaign Sports Commission, the total estimated economic gain from the year's marathon was nearly $4.4 million. Amongst the biggest changes made in the 2010 race will be the course route. Due to traffic issues at Meadowbrook Park in Urbana last year, where parts of the race were held, runners will now be heading into the park at mile marker 8 instead of 4.

Notable Events

Volunteers Rally
The inaugural Illinois Marathon was near cancellation due to the lack of volunteers as of March 16, 2009. The event had about 100 volunteers and needed about 100 to 150 more in order to hold the race safely.  Local officials set an April 1, 2009 deadline for the event planners to have enough staff to keep the 7,600 runners safe at the 311 intersections crossed during the race. Lt. Jon Swenson of the Champaign Police Department said, "There's people coming from all over the continental United States and four foreign countries, and it's not something you can cancel on a moment's notice, we indicated our concerns to them about the urgency to get their volunteers secured so we know we're prepared to move forward with the event."  After the information that the marathon might get canceled was made public, 350 people volunteered within four days.

2009 Marathon Results

Finishers

Male Overall Results

Female Overall Results

2010 Illinois Marathon
The second annual Illinois Marathon offered 5 races: The full marathon, half marathon, marathon relay, 5k, and the 1-kilometer Busy Illinois Youth Run, all of which took place on Saturday, May 1, 2010.  
. The total number of participants in all races was approximately 14,000 runners. 
 As usual, roads along the race route were closed from 6:00 AM until approximately 3:00 PM on race day. A traffic beltway of roads along the outer areas of Champaign-Urbana not effected by the marathon was designated to facilitate travel for residents.

Notable Events 

In September 2010, Christie Clinic (previously the title sponsor of the marathon and half-marathon) and six other Champaign-Urbana buyers purchased the Christie Clinic Illinois Marathon from the previous owner, Mark Knutson of Go Far Events in West Fargo, ND.

2010 Marathon Results

Finishers

Male Overall Results

Female Overall Results

2011 Illinois Marathon 

The 2011 Illinois Marathon took place from Friday, April 29, 2011, to Saturday, April 30, 2011. New this year was the option of a 10k race in addition to the continuing full marathon, half marathon, marathon relay, 5k, and youth run. Additionally, the 5K was now held the Friday evening before the Saturday races. This enabled the additional I-Challenge component of the race, which is an optional "challenge" consisting of running both the Friday evening 5k and the full or half marathon on Saturday. Participants in the I-Challenge received an additional I-Challenge medal along with the medals for the two individual races.

2011 Marathon Results

Male Overall Results

Female Overall Results

2012 Illinois Marathon
New this year was a wave start for the marathon and half marathon, rather than a separate starting time for each race. Additionally, the I-Challenge was expanded to include the option of a "Mini I-Challenge" which consisted of running the 5K run on Friday evening and the 10K run the next morning.

2012 Marathon Results

Male Overall Results

Female Overall Results

References

External links
Official Illinois Marathon Website

Marathons in the United States
Urbana, Illinois
Champaign, Illinois
Track and field in Illinois
Sports in Champaign–Urbana, Illinois